The Cleveland sports community is anchored by three major league professional sports teams: the Cleveland Browns (National Football League), Cleveland Guardians (Major League Baseball), and Cleveland Cavaliers (National Basketball Association). The city is also home to two minor league affiliates that serve as developmental teams for major league franchises: the Cleveland Monsters (American Hockey League, affiliated with the Columbus Blue Jackets of the NHL) and Cleveland Charge (NBA G League, affiliated with the Cavaliers). Another minor league team, the Cleveland Crunch, play in Major League Indoor Soccer. Local sporting facilities include Progressive Field, FirstEnergy Stadium, Rocket Mortgage FieldHouse, the Wolstein Center, and the I-X Center.

Historically, the Browns have been among the winningest franchises in American football history winning eight titles during a short period of time—1946, 1947, 1948, 1949, 1950, 1954, 1955, and 1964.  The Browns have never played in a Super Bowl, getting a game away five times making it to the NFL/AFC Championship Game in 1968, 1969, 1986, 1987, and 1989. 
Former owner Art Modell's relocation of the Browns after the 1995 season (to Baltimore creating the Ravens), caused tremendous heartbreak and resentment among local fans.  Cleveland mayor, Michael R. White, worked with the NFL and Commissioner Paul Tagliabue to bring back the Browns beginning in 1999 season, retaining all team history.  In earlier NFL history, the Cleveland Bulldogs won the NFL Championship in 1924, and the Cleveland Rams won the NFL Championship in 1945 before relocating to Los Angeles.

The Cleveland Guardians (then known as the Indians) won the World Series in 1920 and 1948.  They also won the American League pennant, making the World Series in the 1954, 1995, 1997, and 2016 seasons.  Between 1995 and 2001, Progressive Field (then known as Jacobs Field) sold out 455 consecutive games, a Major League Baseball record until it was broken in 2008. The franchise changed its name beginning with the 2022 season from the Indians to the Guardians.

The Cavaliers have won the Eastern Conference in 2007, 2015, 2016, 2017 and 2018.  The team's first and only NBA championship was won in 2016 after coming back from a 3–1 deficit, defeating the defending champions Golden State Warriors. Afterwards, an estimated 1.3 million people attended a parade held in the Cavs honor on June 22, 2016. This was the first time the city had planned for a championship parade in 50 years. Basketball, the Cleveland Rosenblums dominated the original American Basketball League winning three of the first five championships (1926, 1929, 1930), and the Cleveland Pipers, owned by George Steinbrenner, won the American Basketball League championship in 1962.

From 1964–2016, the city's failure to win a trophy in any major professional sport earned a reputation of being a cursed sports city, extensively covered by the 2016 ESPN 30 for 30 documentary Believeland. In addition, changes in the Cleveland sports landscape led to further heartbreak and resentment among local fans, the most notable instances being Art Modell's relocation of the Browns to Baltimore after the 1995 season (that franchise became the Ravens, with the current Browns team starting play in 1999), and Akron native LeBron James' decision to leave the Cavaliers in 2010 for the Miami Heat.  The Cleveland city sports curse is considered to have ended in June 2016, when the Cavaliers won the NBA Championship against the defending champion Golden State Warriors. Shortly before the Cavaliers' victory, the Monsters defeated the Hershey Bears to become AHL champions, the first time a Cleveland hockey team had won the Calder Cup since 1964.

Notable Cleveland athletes to win top individual accolades include boxer Johnny Kilbane, U.S. Olympic Hall of Fame track and field competitors Jesse Owens and Harrison Dillard, mixed martial artist Stipe Miocic, snowboarder Red Gerard, pole vaulter Katie Nageotte, and professional wrestlers Mike "The Miz" Mizanin and Dolph Ziggler.  Kilbane had a 12-year reign as World Featherweight Champion and is an International Boxing Hall of Fame inductee.  Owens, who grew up in Cleveland after moving from Alabama when he was nine,  participated in the 1936 Summer Olympics in Berlin, where he achieved international fame by winning four gold medals: one each in the 100 meters, the 200 meters, the long jump, and as part of the 4 x 100 meter relay team.  Cleveland native Dillard is a four-time Olympic gold medalist, having won his medals during the 1948 and 1952 Summer Olympics in various track and field events.  Cleveland State University alum and area native Miocic is a two-time UFC World Heavyweight Champion. Area natives Gerard and Nagotte won Olympic gold medals for snowboarding (2018 Winter Olympics) and pole vaulting (2020 Summer Olympics) respectively.  Area natives Mizanin and Ziggler are both two-time World Champions in WWE, with Mizanin holding the WWE Championship and Ziggler the World Heavyweight Championship.

Teams

Professional

Current
Major League

Minor League

(*) - The Charge have one NBA G League (then known as NBADL) Championship to their credit from 2006 when they were based in Albuquerque, New Mexico and known as the Thunderbirds.

Past

College

Current arenas and stadiums

Major professional championships

MLB
Cleveland Buckeyes (1)
1945 Negro World Series championship

Cleveland Guardians (2)
1920 & 1948 World Series championships

Cleveland Spiders (1)
1895 Temple Cup Series championship

NBA
Cleveland Cavaliers (1)
2016 NBA championship

NFL
Cleveland Browns (8)
1946, 1947, 1948, & 1949 AAFC championships
1950, 1954, 1955, & 1964 NFL championships*

Cleveland Bulldogs (1)
1924 NFL championship*

Cleveland Rams (1)
1945 NFL championship*

(*) - Pre-Super Bowl era

Past teams

The city has been home to several additional professional sports franchises, including a women's basketball team, multiple soccer teams, and a past incarnation of the Cleveland Browns now known as the Baltimore Ravens. Cleveland has also been home to several ice hockey franchises, beginning in 1937 with the AHL member Cleveland Barons. The original Barons, although having been the most successful team in AHL history at that point, moved to Jacksonville, Florida, where they subsequently folded after one season. The salient cause of the Baron's move came from Nick Mileti's short-lived WHA franchise, the Cleveland Crusaders, which shared the old Cleveland Arena with the Barons in beginning in 1972. The new league ultimately created a financial disparity that the Barons could not compete with. Local philanthropist George Gund III facilitated the relocation of the NHL's California Golden Seals to Cleveland in 1976 and renamed them the Barons. However, this latest incarnation was short lived, with the team merging with the Minnesota North Stars following the 1977–78 season. In 1992 the Cleveland Lumberjacks, of the also now-defunct IHL, began play and lasted until 2001. Later in 2001, a third incarnation of the Barons was established, this time having returned to the AHL. The Barons moved to Worcester, Massachusetts following the 2006 season.

In 1997, Cleveland was awarded one of the original eight franchises in the WNBA, the Cleveland Rockers. Although the Rockers finished first in the WNBA Eastern Conference on two occasions, they never made an appearance in the WNBA Finals. The team folded in 2003 after the league was unable to find a new owner. Previous owner Gordon Gund had dropped the team from operation, citing financial losses and poor attendance.

From 1978 to 1988, Cleveland was home to the Cleveland Force of the MISL. After the Force folded in 1988 they were replaced by the Cleveland Crunch of the NPSL and MISL, who played from 1989 to 2005. The Crunch won three league championships in the 1990s, being the first Cleveland sports team to win a championship since the 1964 Cleveland Browns. They re-adopted the Force name in 2002 before ceasing operations in 2005. The Crunch returned in 2021 playing in the Major Arena Soccer League 2. 

Outdoor soccer has also been represented in Cleveland via the Cleveland Cobras (1972-Cleveland Stars, 1973–1981 Cobras) of the ASL and the Cleveland Stokers (1967–1968) of the North American Soccer League.

The Cleveland City Stars played in the United Soccer Leagues from 2006 to 2009, winning the USL Second Division championship in 2008 before folding after the 2009 season.

The Cleveland Spiders played in the National League of Major League Baseball from 1887 to 1899.  The team folded after the team owners (Robison brothers) had purchased the St. Louis Browns and sent all of Cleveland's star players there.  Hall of Fame pitcher Cy Young began his career with the Spiders and threw the first of his No-hitters with them.

The Cleveland Gladiators formerly played in the Arena Football League from 2008 to 2017.  The team played home games in Quicken Loans arena.  They reached the arena bowl in 2014.  The team was placed on hiatus for the 2018 and 2019 seasons while renovations were underway at their home arena.  Unfortunately for the team the AFL ceased operations before the team could return for 2020.

College sports

The headquarters of the Mid-American Conference (MAC) are located in Cleveland. The conference also stages both its men's and women's basketball tournaments at Rocket Mortgage FieldHouse.

In NCAA Division I, Cleveland State University fields 16 varsity sports playing in the Horizon League.  The Cleveland State Vikings men's and women's basketball teams play their home games at the Wolstein Center. The university has periodically considered forming a non-scholarship Division I FCS football program.

In NCAA Division III, Case Western Reserve University fields 19 varsity sports playing in the UAA.  Most notably, in both present day and in Cleveland pastime, is the Case Western Reserve Spartans football team, who boasts a history of football dating back to 1890.  Home games are played at DiSanto Field in University Circle.

Although there is no Division I college football team based in the city itself, Cleveland is nationally known for its support of  Ohio State Buckeyes football.  This is due to the team playing occasional games in Cleveland throughout the years, the large fan base of the Buckeyes (including many Ohio State alumni in the Cleveland/NE Ohio area), and numerous Cleveland area high school standouts playing for OSU (such as Glenville High School alums Troy Smith, winner of the 2006 Heisman Trophy, and 2014 National Championship winning quarterback Cardale Jones).  Cleveland's devotion to Buckeyes football has been documented by fan surveys, television ratings, and even the Terminal Tower being lit up in scarlet and gray during OSU's 2014 National Championship run.

The most notable college football win for Cleveland was the city’s only college football bowl game victory—the 1941 Sun Bowl—where the Western Reserve Red Cats, now known as Case Western Reserve University, defeated the Arizona State Bulldogs, now nicknamed Sun Devils, 26–13.

Major events

Cleveland facilities have hosted the Major League Baseball All-Star Game six times, the NBA All-Star Game three times, and the United States Figure Skating Championships four times. The city hosted the Gravity Games, an extreme sports series, from 2002 to 2004, and the Dew Action Sports Tour Right Guard Open in 2007.  In 2013 the city hosted about 11,000 male and female athletes at the National Senior Games. Cleveland hosted the 2014 Gay Games.

See also

Cleveland sports curse
Greater Cleveland
Greater Cleveland Sports Hall of Fame

References

External links
Greater Cleveland Sports Commission